When Rappers Attack is the first solo studio album by American hip hop artist Tame One. It was released by Eastern Conference Records on March 25, 2003.

Background
Tame One was one half of Artifacts along with El Da Sensei. After the breakup of the group in 1997, he linked up with DJ Mighty Mi and company, and signed a deal with the record label Eastern Conference Records. Having contributed several tracks to the Eastern Conference All Stars compilation albums, he set out to develop his solo album, When Rappers Attack. Produced by Camu Tao, J-Zone, RJD2, DJ Mighty Mi, Reef, Johnny Dangerous, and Maliq "DJ P*rno" Griffin, it featured a guest appearance from Cage.

Critical reception

Jason MacNeil of AllMusic gave the album 3 stars out of 5, stating, "A '70s soul tempo on 'Dreamz' is the record's highlight, a song that brings to mind 2Pac." J-23 of HipHopDX gave the album a 7 out of 10, commenting that "Being a part of the Eastern Conference squad comes with some privileges, most notably their top-notch production team." Pete Babb of XLR8R wrote, "It's a shame Tame couldn't be backed with better beats to make this a complete package, but as a rhyming exposition, When Rappers Attack succeeds admirably."

In 2015, Fact placed it at number 74 on the "100 Best Indie Hip-Hop Records of All Time" list.

Track listing

Personnel
Credits adapted from liner notes.

 Tame One – vocals, graffiti, executive production
 Camu Tao – production (1, 3), additional programming (7)
 J-Zone – production (2, 4, 5), turntables (4)
 RJD2 – production (6)
 Cage – vocals (7)
 DJ Mighty Mi – production (7, 10), turntables (7), executive production
 Reef – production (8)
 Johnny Dangerous – production (9, 11)
 Maliq "DJ P*rno" Griffin – production (12)
 Kieran Walsh – mixing
 Michael Sarsfield – mastering
 Merge One – art direction, design
 Jeru – art direction, design
 MA*D – photography, executive production
 Manuel Acevedo – photography
 Swiftflix – photography
 Killah Kev – graphics

References

External links
 

2003 debut albums
Tame One albums
Eastern Conference Records albums
Albums produced by J-Zone
Albums produced by RJD2